Ibtissam (also written Ibtissem) is an Arabic female given name that means "smile".

Ibtissam Lachgar (born 1975), Moroccan feminist, human rights activist, and LGBT advocate
Ibtissam Tiskat, Moroccan singer, songwriter and actress

See also
Ibtisam

Arabic feminine given names
Feminine given names